"Curly" was a song recorded in 1969 by the English rock group The Move. It was written and produced by Roy Wood. In the 19 July 1969 edition of Melody Maker, Chris Welch said the song was "an obvious success for The Move".

The song peaked at number 12 in the UK Singles Chart, and was the last single by the band to feature Carl Wayne before his departure, as well as the first with Rick Price replacing Trevor Burton on bass guitar.  The instrumentation is mainly acoustic, and Roy Wood was featured on multi-tracked recorder as well as acoustic guitar and short a cappella harmonies, with the sole electric instrument, a mellotron, appearing only briefly.

Wood disliked the song, describing it as "really corny" and saying that he was unhappy with the record label's decision to release it as a single over other songs that he preferred. Reportedly the song was also disliked by the band's drummer Bev Bevan, who thought it was too pop and sugary.

Released as a single only, it was later included on the remastered versions of Looking On in 1998 and Shazam in 2007.

Personnel
According To YouTube:

Carl Wayne - vocals, sitar
Roy Wood - lead guitar, recorder, acoustic guitar, mellotron, backing vocals
Rick Price - bass
Bev Bevan - drums, tambourine

References

Song recordings produced by Roy Wood
The Move songs
Songs written by Roy Wood
1969 songs
A&M Records singles
1969 singles
Regal Zonophone Records singles